The United Kingdom competed at the Junior Eurovision Song Contest 2005, where they were represented by Joni Fuller with the song "How Does It Feel".

Before Junior Eurovision

National final 
A national final was held by Independent Television (ITV) to select the third Junior Eurovision entry for the Junior Eurovision Song Contest 2005. The final was held on 3 September 2005 at the Granada Studios in Manchester, broadcast on digital channel ITV2, and was hosted by Michael Underwood and Nikki Sanderson. Televoting selected the winner from the eight competing entries, which votes separated into six voting groups based on geographical area.

At Junior Eurovision
On the night of the contest, held in Hasselt, Belgium, Joni Fuller performed 5th in the running order of the contest, following Romania and preceding Sweden. At the close of the voting Joni has received 28 points, placing 14th of the 16 competing entries, giving the United Kingdom their worst entry at the contest.

In the United Kingdom, the show was televised on digital channel ITV2 with commentary by Underwood. The British spokesperson, who announced the British votes during the final, was national finalist Vicky Gordon. A delayed broadcast, consisting of highlights, was aired on ITV1 the following afternoon. The contest was watched by 700,000 viewers on ITV1 (down 63.16% compared with 2004 viewing figures), with 171,000 watching live on ITV2 (down 22.62% compared with 2004).

ITV withdrew from the contest after 2005 due to poor viewing figures, and the termination of the Junior Eurovision contract signed by ITV in 2003. The UK returned to the contest in 2022, with the BBC replacing ITV as the country’s broadcaster.

Voting

Notes

References

United Kingdom
2005
Junior Eurovision Song Contest